Shefayim (lit. High Hills) is a kibbutz in central Israel located 2.5 miles north of Herzliya along the Mediterranean coast. Shefayim falls under the jurisdiction of Hof HaSharon Regional Council.

History
Kibbutz Shefayim was established in 1935 by Jewish immigrants from Poland. The name is taken from the Book of Isaiah: "I will open rivers in high hills.". During the British Mandate for Palestine, Shefayim was a base for clandestine immigration. 

In the 1948 Arab–Israeli War, it absorbed refugees from the abandoned kibbutz Beit HaArava near the Dead Sea.

In the early 1970s, the kibbutz established Polycad, a plastics factory. In the early 1980s, it established the Shafit biotechnology plant. In the mid-1990s, it acquired the Zirei Israel plant, which has become a leader in the Israeli cotton-ginning industry.

In 2012 IBM acquired New York- and Shefayim-based mobile application developer Worklight Ltd., founded in 2006 by Shahar Kaminitz, formerly of Amdocs.

Economy

Kibbutz Shefayim is among the wealthiest kibbutzim and was one of the few that did not require debt assistance from the state and banks during the recession in the 1980s. On the contrary, Shefayim contributed NIS 4 million to help failing kibbutzim. The main income source of the kibbutz is Hutzot Shefayim, a shopping mall, on real-estate previously classified as agricultural land. Other sources of income are a hotel and conference center, and a water park.

Notable people

 Orit Noked (born 1952), former member of the Knesset
 Rachel Shapira (born 1945), songwriter and poet
 Uri Ben-Ari (1925-2009) is buried at the kibbutz cemetery

References

External links

Shefayim water park  and on the kibbutz homepage in English
Hotel Shefayim

Kibbutzim
Kibbutz Movement
Populated places established in 1935
Populated places in Central District (Israel)
1935 establishments in Mandatory Palestine
Polish-Jewish culture in Israel